Côte-Nord (land area ) is the second-largest administrative region by land area in Quebec, Canada, after Nord-du-Québec. It covers much of the northern shore of the Saint Lawrence River estuary and the Gulf of Saint Lawrence past Tadoussac.

While most of the region is in the same time zone as the rest of Quebec, the far eastern portion east of the 63rd meridian, excluding the Minganie Regional County Municipality, is officially in the Atlantic Time Zone and does not observe daylight saving time.

Population

At the 2016 Canadian Census, the population amounted to 92,518, approximately 1.1% of the province's population, spread across 33 municipalities, various Indian reserves and a Naskapi reserved land. The towns of Baie-Comeau and Sept-Îles combined amount to a little more than half of the population of the region.

Geography and economy
Côte-Nord was created as an administrative region in 1966. Important landmarks of Côte-Nord include Anticosti Island, the Mingan Archipelago, and the Manicouagan Reservoir.

A territorial dispute between Quebec and Newfoundland and Labrador concerning the border between Côte-Nord and Labrador was set on 2 March 1927 by the Judicial Committee of the Privy Council. The boundary was entrenched in the Canadian constitution upon Newfoundland joining confederation in 1949. While this border has not been formally accepted by the Quebec government, the Henri Dorion Commission (Commission d'étude sur l'intégrité du territoire du Québec) concluded in the early 1970s that Quebec no longer has a legal claim to Labrador.

The region's economy is based on mining (mostly iron), lumbering, aluminum production, and tourism. Côte-Nord's fourteen hydroelectric dams, notably the Manicouagan-Outardes complex, supply Hydro-Québec with over 10,500 megawatts of power.

Administrative divisions

Regional county municipalities
 Caniapiscau Regional County Municipality
 La Haute-Côte-Nord Regional County Municipality
 Le Golfe-du-Saint-Laurent Regional County Municipality
 Manicouagan Regional County Municipality
 Minganie Regional County Municipality
 Sept-Rivières Regional County Municipality

Indian reserves
 Essipit
 La Romaine
 Lac-John
 Maliotenam (part of Uashat-Maliotenam)
 Matimekosh
 Mingan
 Nutashkuan
 Pessamit
 Uashat (part of Uashat-Maliotenam)

Naskapi reserved territory
 Kawawachikamach

Demographics 

The median age is 46.4, as opposed to 41.6 for all of Canada. French was the mother tongue of 84.9% of residents in 2021. The next most common mother tongues were the Cree-Innu languages at 7.8% total, followed by English at 4.5%. 0.6% reported both English and French as their first language. Additionally, there were 0.8% who reported both French and a non-official language as their mother tongue, mostly speakers of Cree-Innu languages.

Speakers of Cree-Innu languages mostly live in Pessamit and Uashat-Maliotenam. English speakers mostly live in Le Golfe-du-Saint-Laurent Regional County Municipality.

As of 2021, Indigenous peoples comprised 16.2% of the population and visible minorities contributed 1.5%. The largest visible minority groups in Côte-Nord are Black (0.7%), Arab (0.2%), and Latin American (0.2%). The region is home to 280 recent immigrants (i.e. those arriving between 2016 and 2021). 130 of them come from various African countries.

In 2021, 71.3% of the population identified as Catholic, while 19.6% said they had no religious affiliation. Anglicans were the largest religious minority, at 1.9% of the population, while Muslims were the largest non-Christian religious minority, making up 0.4% of the population.

Counting both single and multiple responses, the most commonly identified ethnocultural ancestries were:

(Percentages may total more than 100% due to rounding and multiple responses).

Major communities
Baie-Comeau
Fermont
Forestville
Havre-Saint-Pierre
Pessamit
Port-Cartier
Sept-Îles

Exploration
The Côte-Nord region was gradually explored by French colonists during the centuries with the help of natives. However it is worth noting the contribution of Henry de Puyjalon (1841-1905), a pioneer in ecology who devoted his life to the exploration of this region.

See also 
 Mingan Archipelago
 Quebec Route 138
 Maritime Quebec

References

External links

 Regional Portal
 Côte-Nord Tourism

 
Administrative regions of Quebec